The Mayor of Greater Manchester is the directly elected metro mayor of Greater Manchester, responsible for strategic governance in the region that includes health, transport, housing, strategic planning, waste management, policing, the Greater Manchester Fire and Rescue Service and skills. The creation of the Mayor of Greater Manchester was agreed between the then Chancellor of the Exchequer, George Osborne, and Greater Manchester's 10 district council leaders. As well as having specific powers, the mayor chairs the Greater Manchester Combined Authority, also assuming the powers of the Greater Manchester Police and Crime Commissioner.

Tony Lloyd was appointed as Interim Mayor for Greater Manchester in May 2015. The first Greater Manchester mayoral election took place on 4 May 2017 and was won by Andy Burnham, who was subsequently re-elected for a second term in May 2021.

Background
The ten local authorities which make up Greater Manchester work together as the Greater Manchester Combined Authority, which carries out work through bodies including Transport for Greater Manchester and the Greater Manchester Waste Disposal Authority. There is a directly elected Mayor of Salford for the City of Salford. In 2008, Bury rejected a proposal for an elected mayor for the borough only. In 2012, Manchester rejected a similar proposal for the City of Manchester only. There is also a Lord Mayor of Manchester which is a ceremonial post.

The proposal for an elected mayor was announced in November 2014 by George Osborne. The creation of an elected mayor for Greater Manchester required new primary legislation and the first election was announced to take place on Thursday 4 May 2017. On 29 May 2015, Lloyd was appointed as interim mayor by the combined authority leaders. The Labour Party candidate was confirmed as being Andy Burnham on 9 August 2016, fending off Ivan Lewis and Tony Lloyd to the position. The Liberal Democrats candidate was confirmed in September 2016 as Jane Brophy, who is a Trafford Borough councillor. Later in September, the Green Party announced that their candidate would be Deyika Nzeribe; however Nzeribe later died as a result of a heart attack on New Year's Day 2017 and Will Patterson was chosen to replace him. In October 2016, the Conservative Party announced Sean Anstee, Leader of Trafford Metropolitan Borough Council would run as their candidate for mayor.

Governance arrangements
Unlike the directly elected London Assembly scrutiny structure that operates in Greater London, the Mayor of Greater Manchester sits on the Greater Manchester Combined Authority alongside the ten council leaders as the eleventh member. The council leaders form part of the mayor's cabinet, each with a clear portfolio of responsibilities. The mayor can be vetoed if a majority vote against any proposals put forward, and the spatial planning strategy requires a unanimous vote of the mayor's cabinet.

Powers and functions
Powers of the mayor initially announced include spatial planning, housing, transport, policing, waste management and skills. In addition to setting the policy direction of the GMCA the mayor serves as an ambassador and public figurehead for the region.

Planning
The mayor is responsible for the creation of a county wide spatial development strategy with adoption subject to unanimous approval of the Members of the GMCA. The mayor is able to make compulsory purchase orders and establish a Mayoral Development Corporation for an area subject to the agreement of the members whose district(s) the order/corporation covers. The mayor has not been granted the ability to call in local planning application decisions judged to be of strategic importance unlike some other combined authority mayors.

Housing
The mayor oversees the administration of the £300m Greater Manchester Housing Investment Fund with the intention of delivering an additional 15,000 homes over a 10-year period. The mayor jointly controls the Greater Manchester Land Commission with the housing minister and other appropriate government ministers, which includes a database of all public sector land and oversee its efficient use including disposal with the aim of contributing toward a target of 10,000 homes being built annually in the region.

Policing and fire

With the creation of the office of mayor, the role of Police and Crime Commissioner for Greater Manchester was subsumed into the new post. The mayor also took over the role formerly exercised by the Greater Manchester Fire & Rescue Authority in setting budgets and taking strategic decisions.

Waste management
The mayor is responsible for the administration of the Greater Manchester Waste Disposal Authority, which is the largest waste disposal authority in the United Kingdom responsible for the waste of 2.4 million people and covering all districts except Wigan which has its own waste authority.

Skills
The GMCA will have full control of the Apprenticeship and adult skills budget for the region from the 2018/19 academic year as well as a commitment to explore devolution of 16-19 education spending. The combined authority also has the power to co-commission alongside the DWP the regions unemployment and back to work programmes.

Justice
As part of the 2016 UK Budget, it was announced that powers relating to criminal justice would be devolved to the mayor as part of a drive to offer seamless interventions for offenders transitioning between prisons and the community and also to join up public services that prevent crime. As part of this, there will also be a new 'Life Chances Investment Fund' which combines several streams of funding for troubled families and back to work for programmes for those with health issues. GMCA will take on the commissioning of National Offender Management Services, liaise in the commissioning of rehabilitation programmes, youth justice and secure schools and female and child sentences under 2 years. The GMCA will also liaise in the running of the court and prison estates and there is an eventual government aim to fully devolve the prisons estate.

Health
The £6bn Health and Social Care budget for the region is devolved to the GMCA and the mayor works alongside the other members and the 22 local clinical commissioning groups to set budgets and direct spending priorities. The GMCA has worked with the commissioning groups in the creation of a Strategic Sustainability Plan.

Transport

The mayor possesses significant powers over transport in Greater Manchester which is arguably the largest transport-connected area outside London following recent developments. The successful delivery of large infrastructure such as the second runway at the publicly owned Manchester Airport in 1998, the amalgamation of the M60 orbital motorway in 2000 and a rapidly expanding and self-sustainable tram system - from 20 stations in 2009 to 92 stations in 2014 - emboldened local authorities and instilled confidence at Whitehall. Responsibilities include overseeing road management (transferred to TfGM in 2009) which include road safety, bus lanes and congestion as well as influence over bus services, the Metrolink tram system and cycling schemes. The regional rail network within Greater Manchester, run mostly by Northern Rail and in parts by TransPennine Express, is franchised by the UK government with no direct control by the mayor (though some potential for input exists via Transport for the North).

The mayor is responsible for the creation of the Local Transport Plan for the region outlining policy and spending decision subject to a 2/3rd majority ratification. The mayor is also responsible for allocating £300m of infrastructure funding over 30 years from the government as well as a yet to be finalised transport funding settlement to follow the existing 2014-2019 settlement. The mayor also has powers to reform the local bus market following the passage of the Bus Services Act

In October 2018, the mayor of Greater Manchester, Andy Burnham, stated his powers to influence transport improvements in the region were insufficient. He described the performance of Northern since the May 2018 timetable as "shocking", the struggle to introduce an holistic bus franchising system as a continuing "challenge" and congestion on the roads as an impediment to the region's future growth - without government action this would result in lost opportunities for Greater Manchester.

List of mayors

Deputy mayors

Deputy mayors for policing and crime

Timeline
Timeline

Notes

References

Local government in Greater Manchester
Greater Manchester
Combined authority mayoralties